Hadena is a genus of moths of the family Noctuidae erected by Franz von Paula Schrank in 1802. About fifteen species are native to North America, while over one-hundred are distributed in the Palearctic realm.

Description
Their eyes are hairy. Palpi upturned and clothed with long hairs. Third joint short. Antennae of male ciliated. Thorax squarely scaled and flattened. Abdomen with dorsal tufts on proximal segments. Tibia lack spines. Wings are short and broad. Hindwings with veins 3 and 4 from cell or on a very short stalk.

Ecology
Hadena larvae often feed on the seeds of plants in the family Caryophyllaceae, the pinks, and some of the adult moths are pollinators of Silene species. Hadena moths have hairy eyes.

There are about 143 to 149 species in the genus.

Zeteolyga was a genus of moths of the family Noctuidae; it is now considered to be a synonym of Hadena.

Species

 Hadena aberrans (Eversmann, 1856)
 Hadena adriana (Schawerda, 1921)
 Hadena afghana (Brandt, 1947)
 Hadena alba (Vallantin, 1893)
 Hadena albertii Hacker, 1996
 Hadena albimacula (Borkhausen, 1792) – white spot
 Hadena amabilis (Barnes & McDunnough, 1918)
 Hadena archaica Hacker, 1996
 Hadena atlantica (Hampson, 1905)
 Hadena aureomixta (Draudt, 1934)
 Hadena avempacei (Tams, 1925)
 Hadena azorica Meyer & Fibiger, 2002
 Hadena bactriana Hacker, 1996
 Hadena badakhshana Hacker, 1996
 Hadena bicruris (Hufnagel, 1766) – lychnis
 Hadena caelestis Troubridge & Crabo, 2002
 Hadena caesia (Denis & Schiffermüller, 1775) – the grey
 Hadena cailinita (Draudt, 1934)
 Hadena canescens (Brandt, 1947)
 Hadena cappadocia Hacker, 1987
 Hadena capsincola (Denis & Schiffermüller, 1775)
 Hadena capsularis (Guenée, 1852)
 Hadena cavalla Pinker, 1980
 Hadena christophi (Möschler, 1862)
 Hadena chrysocyanea Boursin, 1961
 Hadena chrysographa Hacker, 1996
 Hadena cimelia (Brandt, 1938)
 Hadena circumvadis (Smith, 1902)
 Hadena clara (Staudinger, 1901)
 Hadena compta (Denis & Schiffermüller, 1775) – varied coronet
 Hadena confucii (Draudt, 1950)
 Hadena confusa (Hufnagel, 1766) – marbled coronet
 Hadena consparcatoides (Schawerda, 1928)
 Hadena corrupta (Herz, 1898)
 Hadena danilewskyi Hacker, 1996
 Hadena defreinai Hacker, Kuhna & Gross, 1986
 Hadena dianthoecioides (Boursin, 1940)
 Hadena difficilis Hacker, 1996
 Hadena draudti (Brandt, 1938)
 Hadena drenowskii (Rebel, 1930)
 Hadena dsungarica Hacker, 1996
 Hadena duercki (Draudt, 1934)
 Hadena ectrapela (Smith, 1898) (syn. H. jola (Barnes & Benjamin, 1924))
 Hadena ectypa (Morrison, 1875)
 Hadena elbursica Hacker, 1996
 Hadena esopis (Druce, 1889)
 Hadena esperi Hacker, 1992
 Hadena eximia (Staudinger, 1895)
 Hadena femina Hacker, 1996
 Hadena fibigeri Hacker, 1996
 Hadena filograna (Esper, 1788)
 Hadena finitima Hacker, 1996
 Hadena gabrieli Troubridge & Crabo, 2002
 Hadena gandhara Hacker, 1996
 Hadena germaniciae Boursin, 1959
 Hadena glaciata (Grote, 1882)
 Hadena gueneei (Staudinger, 1901)
 Hadena gyulaii Hacker, 1996
 Hadena heringi (Draudt, 1934)
 Hadena hissarica Hacker, 1996
 Hadena hreblayi Hacker, 1996
 Hadena humilis (Christoph, 1893)
 Hadena hyrcanoides Hacker, 1996
 Hadena ignicola (Warren, 1909)
 Hadena inexpectata Varga, 1979
 Hadena intensa Boursin, 1962
 Hadena irregularis (Hufnagel, 1766) – viper's bugloss
 Hadena karagaia (Bang-Haas, 1912)
 Hadena karsholti Hacker, 1996
 Hadena klapperichi Boursin, 1960
 Hadena kurajica Hacker, 1996
 Hadena labecula Zetterstedt, [1839]
 Hadena lafontainei Troubridge & Crabo, 2002
 Hadena lucida (Brandt, 1938)
 Hadena luteocincta (Rambur, 1834)
 Hadena lypra (Püngeler, 1904)
 Hadena maccabei Troubridge & Crabo, 2002
 Hadena macilenta (Brandt, 1947)
 Hadena magnifica Hacker, 1996
 Hadena magnolii (Boisduval, 1829)
 Hadena melanochroa (Staudinger, [1892])
 Hadena mesolampra (Brandt, 1938)
 Hadena minorata (Smith, 1888)
 Hadena miserabilis (Alphéraky, 1892)
 Hadena montana (Brandt, 1941)
 Hadena musculina (Staudinger, [1892])
 Hadena naumanni Hacker, 1996
 Hadena nebulosa Hacker, 1996
 Hadena neglecta Hacker, 1992
 Hadena nekrasovi Hacker, 1996
 Hadena nevadae (Draudt, 1933)
 Hadena nigricata Pinker, 1969
 Hadena niveifera (Hampson, 1906)
 Hadena nobilis Hacker, 1996
 Hadena nuratina Hacker & Klyuchko, 1996
 Hadena orihuela Hacker, 1996
 Hadena paropamisos Hacker, 1992
 Hadena paulula Troubridge & Crabo, 2002
 Hadena perornata (Draudt, 1950)
 Hadena perpetua Hacker, 1996
 Hadena perplexa (Denis & Schiffermüller, 1775) – tawny shears
 Hadena persimilis Hacker, 1996
 Hadena persparcata (Draudt, 1950)
 Hadena pfeifferi (Draudt, 1934)
 Hadena plumasata (Buckett & Bauer, 1967)
 Hadena praetermissa Hacker, 1996
 Hadena pseudoclara Hacker, 1996
 Hadena pseudodealbata Hacker, 1988
 Hadena pseudohyrcana de Freina & Hacker, 1985
 Hadena pumicosa Hacker, 1996
 Hadena pumila (Staudinger, 1878)
 Hadena purpurea Hacker, 1996
 Hadena pygmaea Boursin, 1962
 Hadena quotuma Hacker & Gyulai, 1998
 Hadena rjabovi (Idrisov, 1961)
 Hadena rolleti Lajonquière, 1969
 Hadena ronkayorum Hacker, 1996
 Hadena ruetimeyeri Boursin, 1951
 Hadena salmonea (Draudt, 1934)
 Hadena sancta (Staudinger, 1859)
 Hadena schwingenschussi (Draudt, 1934)
 Hadena scythia Klyuchko & Hacker, 1996
 Hadena secreta Hacker, 1996
 Hadena silenes (Hübner, [1822])
 Hadena silenides (Staudinger, 1895)
 Hadena siskiyou Troubridge & Crabo, 2002
 Hadena sogdiana Hacker, 1996
 Hadena splendida (Draudt, 1950)
 Hadena staudingeri (Draudt, 1934)
 Hadena strouhali Boursin, 1955
 Hadena subhyrcana Hacker, 1996
 Hadena syriaca (Osthelder, 1933)
 Hadena tephrochrysea (Draudt, 1934)
 Hadena tephroleuca (Boisduval, 1833)
 Hadena thecaphaga (Draudt, 1937)
 Hadena thomasi Hacker, 1996
 Hadena tristis (Draudt, 1934)
 Hadena variolata (Smith, 1888)
 Hadena vartianica Hacker, 1996
 Hadena vulcanica (Turati, 1908)
 Hadena vulpecula (Brandt, 1938)
 Hadena wehrlii (Draudt, 1934)
 Hadena weigerti Hacker, 1996
 Hadena wiltshirei (Brandt, 1947)
 Hadena wolfi Hacker, 1992
 Hadena zaprjagaevi Hacker & Nekrasov, 1996

Gallery

References

External links

 
Hadenini
Taxa named by Franz von Paula Schrank